This is a list of hood films – films focusing on the culture and life of African-Americans, Hispanic Americans, and/or in some cases, Asian Americans living in segregated, low-income urban communities, as well as comparably deprived and crime-ridden communities in other countries such as the UK.

List of hood films

1970s
The Harder They Come, 1972
Cooley High, 1975
Walk Proud, 1979

1980s
The Outsiders, 1983
Rumble Fish, 1983
Colors, 1988
Do the Right Thing, 1989

1990s
 
King of New York, 1990
New Jack City, 1991
Boyz n the Hood, 1991
Straight Out of Brooklyn, 1991
Deep Cover, 1992
Juice, 1992
Just Another Girl on the I.R.T., 1992
American Me, 1992
South Central, 1992
Trespass, 1992
Menace II Society, 1993
Blood In Blood Out, 1993
Strapped, 1993
Poetic Justice, 1993
Above the Rim, 1994
I Like It Like That, 1994
Sugar Hill, 1994
Mi Vida Loca, 1994
Fresh, 1994
Jason's Lyric, 1994
Higher Learning, 1995
Rude, 1995
Soul Survivor, 1995
Tales from the Hood, 1995
Bad Boys, 1995
Clockers, 1995
Dangerous Minds, 1995
Dead Presidents, 1995
Friday, 1995
New Jersey Drive, 1995
La Haine, 1995
Sunset Park, 1996
Bullet, 1996
Set It Off, 1996
The Substitute, 1996
One Eight Seven, 1997
Ma 6-T va crack-er, 1997
Squeeze, 1997
First Time Felon, 1997
Fakin' da Funk, 1997
I'm Bout It, 1997
Always Outnumbered, 1998
American History X, 1998
He Got Game, 1998
Streetwise, 1998
Caught Up, 1998
The Players Club, 1998
Short Sharp Shock, 1998
I Got the Hook-Up, 1998
Zona J, 1998
Belly, 1998
Slam, 1998
In Too Deep, 1999
Corrupt, 1999  
Light It Up, 1999
Hot Boyz, 1999
Thicker than Water (1999 film), 1999
Whiteboyz, 1999
The Wood, 1999
Urban Menace, 1999

2000s
 
Baller Blockin', 2000
Amores Perros, 2000
Leprechaun in the Hood, 2000
3 Strikes, 2000
Turn It Up, 2000
Next Friday, 2000
Baby Boy, 2001
Gang Tapes, 2001
Prison Song, 2001
Blue Hill Avenue, 2001
Hardball, 2001
Training Day, 2001
Bones, 2001
How High, 2001
Shottas, 2002
Paper Soldiers, 2002
Barbershop, 2002
City of God, 2002
8 Mile, 2002
State Property, 2002
Snipes, 2002
Paid in Full, 2002
Empire, 2002
Bad Boys II, 2003
Leprechaun: Back 2 tha Hood, 2003
Ride or Die, 2003
Bullet Boy, 2004
Doing Hard Time, 2004
Never Die Alone, 2004
 Divided City, 2004
On the Outs, 2004
Back in the Day, 2005
Hustle & Flow, 2005
Coach Carter, 2005
State Property 2, 2005
Four Brothers, 2005
Get Rich or Die Tryin', 2005
Dirty, 2005
Boss'n Up, 2005
Hood of the Living Dead, 2005
ATL, 2006
Gridiron Gang, 2006
Kidulthood, 2006
Waist Deep, 2006
Killa Season, 2006
Tough Enough, 2006
Quinceañera, 2006
Hood of Horror, 2006
City of Men, 2007
Freedom Writers, 2007
American Gangster, 2007
Weapons, 2007
Adulthood, 2008
Death Toll, 2008
Street Kings, 2008
Gran Torino, 2008
Talento de Barrio, 2008
Streets of Blood, 2008
Baby, 2008
Fallout, 2008
Precious, 2009
Before I Self Destruct, 2009
Notorious, 2009
Brooklyn's Finest, 2009
A Day in the Life, 2009
Dough Boys, 2009
La Mission, 2009

2010s

Lottery Ticket, 2010
Gun, 2010
Ghetto Stories: The Movie, 2010
Down for Life, 2010
Shank, 2010
Attack the Block, 2011
Gun Hill Road, 2011
Snow on tha Bluff, 2011
Ill Manors, 2012
End of Watch, 2012
LUV, 2012
Spring Breakers, 2012
Snitch, 2013
Fruitvale Station, 2013
The Inevitable Defeat of Mister and Pete, 2013
Avenged, 2013
Girlhood, 2014
Blame It On the Streets, 2014
Imperial Dreams, 2014
Dope, 2015
Brotherly Love, 2015
Straight Outta Compton, 2015
Chi-Raq, 2015
Tangerine, 2015
Kicks, 2016
Barbershop: The Next Cut, 2016
Brotherhood, 2016
Moonlight, 2016
Cardboard Gangsters, 2017
Deuces, 2017
Lowriders, 2017
All Eyez on Me, 2017
True to the Game, 2017
Dayveon, 2017
Kings, 2017
Roxanne Roxanne, 2017
Gook, 2017
The First Purge, 2018
White Boy Rick, 2018
City of Lies, 2018
The Hate U Give, 2018
Tales from the Hood 2, 2018
Blindspotting, 2018
Pimp, 2018
Blood Brother, 2018
Blue Story, 2019
Canal Street, 2019
Brian Banks, 2019
Bel-Air, 2019
Gully, 2019
Street Flow, 2019

2020s
All Day and a Night, 2020
Bad Boys for Life, 2020
Cut Throat City, 2020

Parodies
House Party, 1990
CB4, 1993
Fear of a Black Hat, 1994
Don't Be a Menace to South Central While Drinking Your Juice in the Hood, 1996
High School High, 1996
Malibu's Most Wanted, 2003
Death of a Dynasty, 2003
Dance Flick, 2009
Anuvahood, 2011
School Dance, 2014
Grow House, 2017
Bodied, 2017

See also
 African American cinema
 Blaxploitation, film genre
 Gangster film

References 

 List
Hood